The  (lit. West Shōnan Bypass) is a toll road in Kanagawa Prefecture, Japan. It is owned and managed by Central Nippon Expressway Company.

Overview

Officially the road is designated as a bypass for National Route 1.

The road closely follows the coastline of Sagami Bay, facilitating access between the Tokyo urban area and the city of Odawara in western Kanagawa Prefecture. At the eastern terminus the Seishō Bypass continues as a toll-free road managed by the Ministry of Land, Infrastructure and Transport. In the west, the main route terminates near the resort town of Hakone, while a short branch route terminates at an intersection with National Route 135 which leads to the resort town of Atami and the Izu Peninsula.

The first section of the road was opened to traffic in 1967 and the entire route was completed in 1972. The main route has 4 lanes of traffic and the Ishibashi branch route has 2 lanes.

There are three toll collection points along the road. On the main route at the Tachibana Toll Plaza, a toll of 250 yen is collected from regular passenger cars. At Kōzu Interchange these vehicles are charged 150 yen at the eastbound exit and westbound entrance. At Ishibashi Interchange 200 yen is collected. Electronic Toll Collection (ETC) is accepted for payment, however no discount programs are in effect.

In September 2007 Typhoon Fitow caused extensive damage to the road, reducing some sections to two lanes of traffic and forcing the complete closure of other sections. The entire road was restored to full capacity on April 25, 2008.

Interchange list

 IC - interchange, JCT - junction, PA - parking area, TB - toll gate

Main Route

Ishibashi Branch Route

References

External links 
Central Nippon Expressway Company

Toll roads in Japan